Onychostoma minnanensis is a species of cyprinid in the genus Onychostoma.

References

minnanensis
Cyprinid fish of Asia
Freshwater fish of China